MyGov (Hindustani: Merī Sarkār) is a citizen engagement platform launched by the Government of India on 26 July 2014 to promote the active participation of Indian citizens in their country's governance and development. It is aimed at creating a common platform for Indian citizens to "crowdsource governance ideas from citizens". Its users discuss and contribute to various government projects and plans. It also allows users to upload documents in various formats. The website is hosted and managed by the National Informatics Centre (NIC). Prime Minister Narendra Modi stated that the aim was to reduce the long gap developed between the electorate and the Executive after being elected.

In the first week of August 2014, MyGov received 100,000 registered users, barely two weeks after its initiation. Google became the first multinational firm to collaborate with MyGov. Shortly before his first address to the nation through All India Radio, it was announced that ideas and questions for the Prime Minister submitted to MyGov may be responded to in subsequent radio addresses.

The website also has an associated mobile app.

Reception

As of the first week of September 2014, within 45 days of its launch, as many as 215,000 users were enrolled at MyGov and more than 28,000 users submitted their ideas on a variety of issues. The format of the Prime Minister's online Independence Day message was extracted from suggestions submitted to MyGov. The platform has attracted many users who were not previously engaged in other social media such as Facebook and Twitter. Within 50 days of its inception, more than 23,000 entries were received for seven different government ministries in addition to the Prime Minister's Office through the 'Creative Corner' section alone.

Mobile App
The MyGov app is developed by the National Informatics Centre that comes under the Ministry of Electronics and Information Technology, Government of India.

Groups
There are various pre-defined groups to which users can selectively subscribe to. The objective of each group is to bring positive changes to the relevant area with people's participation. In each group, users are provided with two domains, 'Do' and 'Discuss'. The 'Do' section includes both online and on-ground tasks to which contributors may assign themselves. The 'discuss' section may be used for discussing different relevant issues affecting the nation. It may also be used for providing vital information regarding the topic and also suggest and propose new ideas. The users are awarded activity points based upon their individual contributions. Users may also volunteer and submit their own entries. These are reviewed by other members, evaluated by experts and approved subsequently. Approved tasks earn credit points.

MyGov also serves as a digital library of topics regarding India.

Open Forum

The Open Forum is for discussion of issues of national importance. It spans across various groups and every registered member of MyGov is eligible for participation. Saansad Adarsh Gram Yojana and the new institution which is going to replace the existing Planning Commission of India were the first topics discussed here.

Mann Ki Baat

MyGov is one of the platforms through which citizens can submit input for the monthly Program of the PM called Mann ki Baat broadcast over the radio. Citizens can submit input on the MyGov forum or on the Toll Free Number 1800-11-7800 once the line is opened.

Creative Corner

The Creative Corner gives users a platform to showcase their innovative zeal and enables them to "leave an imprint on India’s history". This corner allows citizens to creatively engage with various Government departments. From time to time, Ministries will need creative inputs on the creativity related aspects of their initiatives. The tasks may vary from proposing a design for a mobile application to providing a draft banner/logo as well to suggesting a creative punch line for an initiative. The scope is "extensive" according to the official site, but the end result is "extremely satisfying".

MyGov 2.0
The government's crowdsourcing platform MyGov.in launched its version 2.0, with newer features such as hashtags, polls, interactive discussion forums and social media account integration. The impact assessment of this citizen engagement platform was done by Indian Institute of Public Administration (IIPA), New Delhi.

See also
 India.gov.in
 Digital India
 Mobile Seva
 Swachh Bharat Abhiyan
 Aarogya Setu
 https://www.india.gov.in/

References

External links

MyGov Subdomains 

 MyGov Quiz | Take Care of your Talent……..
 Unified Online Pledge
 MyGov Innovation | Innovate India
 MyGov Blogs
 Swachh Bharat #MyCleanIndia
 Transforming India - Transforming India
 8 Years of Transforming India
 Home - Self4Society
 Campus Ambassador Programme
 AatmaNirbharBharat Abhiyan
 IndiaNCC
 Aarogyasetu
 Azadi Ka Amrit Mahotsav

MyGov State Instances 

 Arunachal.MyGov.in
 Assam.MyGov.in
 Hamar Chhattisgarh
 Goa.MyGov.in
 Haryana.MyGov.in
 Karnataka.MyGov.in
 Mera Madhya Pradesh
 Maharashtra.MyGov.in
 Manipur.MyGov.in
 Tripura.MyGov.in
 Jharkhand.mygov.in
 nagaland.MyGov.in
 Himachal.MyGov.in
 Uttarakhand.MyGov.in
 Tamil Nadu.MyGov.in
 UP.MyGov.in
 jk.MyGov.in
 Gujarat.MyGov.in
 ddd.MyGov.in

Ministry of Communications and Information Technology (India)
Government services web portals in India
2014 establishments in India
Modi administration initiatives
Digital India initiatives